Toe Naing Mann (born 29 June 1978) is a Burmese businessman and founder of Red Link Communications, a major Burmese telecommunications group. Toe Naing Mann's father is Shwe Mann, a former military general and Speaker of the Pyithu Hluttaw. He has a Ph.D in geology. Toe Naing Mann is a key advisor for the Pyidaungsu Hluttaw's Commission for the Assessment of Legal Affairs and Special Issues.

Toe Naing Mann is married to Zay Zin Latt, the daughter of Khin Shwe, a business tycoon who owns Zaykabar Company. Cherry FM radio station, owned by Zay Zin Latt, was pressured to suspend its operation after her father in law Shwe Mann was purged from USDP Chairman post in August 2015.

References

Burmese businesspeople
1978 births
Living people